The Philippine National Volleyball Federation Inc. (PNVF), also known as Volleyball Philippines, is the national sport association for volleyball in the Philippines. It is recognized by the Philippine Olympic Committee (POC), the Asian Volleyball Confederation (AVC) and the International Volleyball Federation (FIVB).

History

PVF–LVPI dispute

Prior to the formation of the Philippine National Volleyball Federation (PNVF), the Philippine Volleyball Federation (PVF) was recognized by the Philippine Olympic Committee (POC) as the national sports association for volleyball in the Philippines. The PVF lost POC recognition in 2014 following a leadership crisis after PVF Vice-president Karl Chan assumed the presidency after PVF President Gener Dungo filed an indefinite leave of absence. Dungo was alleged to have mismanaged the PVF's funds.

The Fédération Internationale de Volleyball (FIVB) in January 2015, gave provisional membership to a new volleyball federation, the Larong Volleyball sa Pilipinas, Inc. (LVPI) The PVF was suspended but remained affiliated with the FIVB, although it has lost all its rights associated with membership. The provisional status has allowed the LVPI to organize and send national teams to FIVB-sanctioned events for the next few years a privilege which was previously reserved to the PVF. Although the PVF continues to claim that it is the legitimate national sports association for volleyball in the Philippines. The LVPI on their part has lobbied to be granted full FIVB-membership and the full expulsion of PVF from the international volleyball body.

Formation
The FIVB announced in January 2020, that it would send a delegation to end the PVF-LVPI dispute. The Philippine Olympic Committee (POC) then scheduled an election to determine the officials of a new national sports association for volleyball prior to the 2021 FIVB World Congress in a bid to end the dispute. The POC reportedly had talks that the contested positions to be divided among the LVPI, PVF, a third group called the Alliances of Philippine Volleyball Inc. (APVI), and itself. PVF President Edgardo Cantada rejected the POC's proposal Although several PVF officials defied Cantada's stance and expressed interest to join the elections.

In 2021, the PNVF was formed with its first set of officials elected on January 25, 2021, in an interim basis. Ramon "Tats" Suzara of AVPI was elected as the PNVF's president unopposed with Ricky Palou withdrawing his presidential bid.

The PNVF was given provisional membership in the POC on January 27, 2021, with a Securities and Exchange Commission registration needed to be given full membership in the POC.

In February 2021, PNVF gets official recognition from FIVB as the national governing body in the Philippines as the PVF was expelled. It plans to launch the league in July 2021. It has also received recognition from the Asian Volleyball Confederation, the Asia's governing body.

The PNVF plans to organize its own domestic league separate from the two existing commercial leagues, the Premier Volleyball League and the Philippine Super Liga. The proposed name for the league is the PNVF Champions League. The PNVF announced plans to hold an inaugural season of a men's league in September 2021.

Officials
 President – Ramon "Tats" Suzara
 Chairman – Arnel Hajan
 Vice President – Richard Palou
 Secretary General - Donaldo Caringal
 Treasurer – Charo Soriano 
 Auditor - Yul Benosa
 Board Members –
 Ariel Paredes
 Tony Boy Liao 
 Rodrigo Roque
 Carmela Gamboa
 Karl Chan
 Fr. Vic Calvo
 Michael Angelo Vargas

External links

References

Volleyball in the Philippines
Volleyball
2021 establishments in the Philippines
National members of the Asian Volleyball Confederation